This is a list of supermarket chains in Bosnia and Herzegovina.

Supermarkets and hypermarkets

Former chains

Drugstores

Former

Home improvement, furniture and toys

Former

Clothing, sport and healthcare

Former

Food and coffee chains

Former

Cinema and entertainment chains

Former

Gas stations

References

External links
www.katalozi.ba
www.snizenja.veza.ba
www.akcijeikatalozi.ba

 
Supermarkets
Bosnia